James Parady (born April 30, 1961) is an American football coach.  He is head football coach at Marist College, a position he has held since 1992.  A native of Nashua, New Hampshire, Parady attended the University of Maine and is a member of Delta Tau Delta fraternity.

Head coaching record

References

External links
 Marist profile

1961 births
Living people
American football quarterbacks
Brown Bears football coaches
Colby Mules football coaches
Hamilton Continentals football coaches
Maine Black Bears football players
Marist Red Foxes football coaches
Northeastern Huskies football coaches
Syracuse Orange football coaches
Sportspeople from Nashua, New Hampshire
Sportspeople from Poughkeepsie, New York